The Achimota class are a series of two fast attack craft in service in the Ghana Navy. They are based on the same Lürssen PB 57 design as the Turkish . The two vessels were acquired by Ghana in the late 1970s and commissioned in 1981. The Achimota class is equipped with an OTO Melara  dual-purpose gun and a  anti-aircraft gun. They are primarily used for fishery protection duties.

Design and description
The Achimota-class fast attack craft (FAC) are based on the Lürssen PB 57 design and share a basic layout as the Turkish .

The FACs mount one OTO Melara  dual-purpose gun and one Breda  anti-aircraft gun (AA) gun. The Achimota class are equipped with Thomsen-CSF Canopus A surface search and fire control radar a LIDD optronic director. The vessels have a complement of 55, including 5 officers.

Ships in class

Construction and career
Two FACs were ordered by Ghana in October 1977 from Lürssen to be constructed at their shipyard in  Vegesack, West Germany. Both ships were launched on 14 March 1979 and entered service with the Ghana Navy on 27 March 1981. They are primarily used for fisheries protection and patrol. In 1989, Yogaga underwent a major refit at Swan Hunter in Wallsend, United Kingdom which was completed on 8 May. On 14 September 1990, Achimota was hit by National Patriotic Front of Liberia (NPFL) artillery while on a fact-finding mission near Monrovia. As a result, two Ghanaian sailors and three Nigerian nurses were killed, and the Ghanaian Air Force retaliated with airstrikes. Achimota underwent a similar refit to Yogaga at CMN Cherbourg, in Cherbourg Naval Base, France beginning in May 1991. Yogaga was sent to CMN Cherbourg to undergo repairs and work on both FACs was completed in August 1992.

Notes

Citations

Sources

External links
 FPB-57 at deagel.com

Ships of the Ghana Navy
Fast attack craft